Jike may refer to:
 Jike Station
 People's Daily